Maurice Hehne (born 14 April 1997) is a German footballer who plays as centre-back for Carl Zeiss Jena.

Career
Hehne began his career in his hometown with VfB Pößneck before moving to the youth academy of Carl Zeiss Jena. In 2013, he left Jena to join Bremen's U-17 team. On 14 May 2016, he made his debut replacing Ousman Manneh in the 83rd minute of Werder Bremen II's 2–1 win at VfR Aalen.

References

External links
 

1997 births
Living people
People from Pößneck
Association football defenders
German footballers
3. Liga players
Regionalliga players
SV Werder Bremen II players
Hannover 96 II players
FSV Zwickau players
FC Carl Zeiss Jena players
Footballers from Thuringia